Trustees of Dartmouth College v. Woodward, 17 U.S. (4 Wheat.) 518 (1819), was a landmark decision in United States corporate law from the United States Supreme Court dealing with the application of the Contracts Clause of the United States Constitution to private corporations. The case arose when the president of Dartmouth College was deposed by its trustees, leading to the New Hampshire legislature attempting to force the college to become a public institution and thereby place the ability to appoint trustees in the hands of the governor of New Hampshire. The Supreme Court upheld the sanctity of the original charter of the college, which pre-dated the creation of the State.

The decision settled the nature of public versus private charters and resulted in the rise of the American business corporation and the  American free enterprise system.

Background
In 1770 King George III of  Great Britain granted a charter to Dartmouth College. This document spelled out the purpose of the school, set up the structure to govern it, and gave land to the college. In 1816, over thirty years after the conclusion of the American Revolution, the legislature of New Hampshire altered Dartmouth's charter in order to reinstate the College's deposed president, place the ability to appoint positions in the hands of the governor, add new members to the board of trustees, and create a state board of visitors with veto power over trustee decisions. This effectively converted the school from a private to a public institution. The College's book of records, corporate seal, and other corporate property were removed. The trustees of the College objected and sought to have the actions of the legislature declared unconstitutional.

The trustees retained Dartmouth alumnus Daniel Webster, a New Hampshire native who would later become a U.S. Senator for Massachusetts and Secretary of State under President Millard Fillmore. Webster argued the college's case against William H. Woodward, the state-approved secretary of the new board of trustees. Webster's speech in support of Dartmouth (which he described as "a small college," adding, "and yet there are those who love it") was so moving that it apparently helped convince Chief Justice John Marshall.

Judgment
The decision, handed down on February 2, 1819, ruled in favor of the college and invalidated the act of the New Hampshire Legislature, which in turn allowed Dartmouth to continue as a private institution and take back its buildings, seal, and charter. The majority opinion of the court was written by John Marshall. The opinion reaffirmed Marshall's belief in the sanctity of a contract (also seen in Fletcher v. Peck) as necessary to the functioning of a republic (in the absence of royal rule, contracts rule).

The Court ruled that the college's corporate charter qualified as a contract between private parties, the King and the trustees, with which the legislature could not interfere. Even though the United States were no longer royal colonies, the contract was still valid because the Constitution said that a state could not pass laws to impair a contract. The fact that the government had commissioned the charter did not transform the school into a civil institution. Chief Justice Marshall's opinion emphasized that the term "contract" referred to transactions involving individual property rights, not to "the political relations between the government and its citizens."

Significance
The decision was not without precedent, earlier the Court had invalidated a state act in Fletcher v. Peck (1810), concluding that contracts, no matter how they were procured (in that case, a land contract had been illegally obtained), cannot be invalidated by state legislation. Fletcher was not a popular decision at the time, and a public outcry ensued. Thomas Jefferson's earlier commiseration with New Hampshire Governor William Plumer stated essentially that the earth belongs to the living. Popular opinion influenced some state courts and legislatures to declare that state governments had an absolute right to amend or repeal a corporate charter. The courts, however, have imposed limitations to this.

After the Dartmouth decision, many states wanted more control so they passed laws or constitutional amendments giving themselves the general right to alter or revoke at will, which the courts found to be a valid reservation. The courts had established, however, that the alteration or revocation of private charters or laws authorizing private charters must be reasonable and cannot cause harm to the members (founders, stockholders, and the like).

The traditional view holds that this case is one of the most important Supreme Court rulings, strengthening the Contracts Clause and limiting the power of the States to interfere with private charters, including those of commercial enterprises.

See also 
 United States corporate law
 Dartmouth College
 John Marshall
 Contract Clause
 Special district (United States)
 Pennsylvania College Cases 80 U.S. 190 (1871)
 Case of Sutton's Hospital (1612) 77 Eng Rep 960
Phillips v Bury, 1 Ld Raym 5; 2 TR 346, Lord Holt
Attorney-General v Pearce, 2 Atk 87, Lord Hardwicke
John Wheelock

Notes

External links 
 
 

v. Woodward
United States Constitution Article One case law
United States Supreme Court cases of the Marshall Court
United States corporate case law
1819 in United States case law
Contract Clause case law
Legal history of New Hampshire
Corporate personhood
United States Supreme Court cases